Alexander Stepheson (pronounced Steevis-son; born August 7, 1987) is an American former professional basketball player. He played college basketball for North Carolina and USC.

High school career
Stepheson played high school basketball at Harvard-Westlake School in North Hollywood, California, where he grabbed 20 or more rebounds in 16 games as a senior.

Awards and highlights
Averaged 17.0 points, 14.4 rebounds, and 3.9 blocks as a junior.
Led Harvard-Westlake School to a 26–4 mark and California Southern Sectional title in 2005.
Averaged 20.4 points and 17.8 rebounds as a senior.
Had a five-game streak with 32, 31, 23, 28, and 21 rebounds.
Set a single-game school mark with 32 rebounds.
Broke the school record for career rebounds in just three seasons (the previous record was held by former Stanford University center and NBA player Jason Collins).
2006 Fourth-team Parade All-American
Named the Co-MVP of the East All-Stars at the 2006 Roundball Classic in Chicago, after he had 15 points and 9 rebounds.

College career
Stepheson originally played college basketball for the University of North Carolina with the Tar Heels. At the end of 2007–08 season, Stepheson decided to transfer to the University of Southern California, citing family illness. He chose to play for the USC Trojans on July 17, 2008. In 2009, he was named Pac-10 Player of the Week, for the week of Dec. 14–20.

Stepheson played in the Reese's College All-Star Game, where he had 6 points and 7 rebounds. He also played in the Portsmith Invitational Tournament, where he averaged 8 point and 10 rebounds over three games.

Professional career

Panionios (2011–2013)
After going undrafted in the 2011 NBA draft, Stepheson began his professional career in Greece, with the Greek League club Panionios. During the 2011–12 season, he averaged 10.3 points and 7.3 rebounds per game in 21 games in the Greek League. Stepheson subsequently missed the entire 2012–13 season due to an injury he suffered with Panionios.

Union Olimpija (2013–2014)
In July 2013, Stepheson signed a one-year deal to play in Slovenia with Union Olimpija. In 20 Premier A Slovenian League games for Olimpija, Stepheson averaged 6.6 points and 5.2 rebounds per game. He also averaged 8.3 points and 5.7 rebounds per game in the Adriatic League.

İstanbul BB (2014–2015)
In July 2014, Stepheson joined the Sacramento Kings for the 2014 NBA Summer League. He later signed in Turkey with the Turkish League club İstanbul BB for the 2014–15 season. In 29 games in the Turkish League, he averaged 12.3 points and 9.2 rebounds per game.

NBA and D-League (2015–2016)
In July 2015, Stepheson joined the Dallas Mavericks for the 2015 NBA Summer League. On October 7, 2015, he signed with the Memphis Grizzlies. However, he was waived on October 24 after appearing in three preseason games. On October 31, he was acquired by the Iowa Energy of the NBA Development League as an affiliate player of the Grizzlies. On November 14, he made his debut with Iowa in a 98–95 win over the Sioux Falls Skyforce, recording 13 points, 17 rebounds, two assists and one steal in 37 minutes. On January 29, 2016, he was named in the East All-Star team for the 2016 NBA D-League All-Star Game after averaging 15.7 points, 13.3 rebounds, 1.3 blocks and 34.3 minutes in 26 games.

On February 20, 2016, Stepheson signed a 10-day contract with the Los Angeles Clippers. He made his NBA debut later that night in a 115–112 loss to the Golden State Warriors, recording one rebound in two minutes. Two days later, Stepheson scored his first basket on a tip-in against the Phoenix Suns and also his first block after rejecting Jon Leuer. On March 2, he signed a second 10-day contract with the Clippers. Following the expiration of his second 10-day contract, the Clippers parted ways with Stepheson.

On March 12, 2016, Stepheson signed a 10-day contract with the Memphis Grizzlies to help the team deal with numerous injuries. Memphis had to use an NBA hardship exemption in order to sign him as he made their roster stand at 17, two over the allowed limited of 15. In just his second game for the Grizzlies on March 14, Stepheson recorded 12 points and 15 rebounds in 25 minutes off the bench against the Houston Rockets, playing extended minutes due to the team's injury depleted roster. On March 22, following the conclusion of his 10-day contract, the Grizzlies parted ways with Stepheson. The following day, he returned to Iowa. At the season's end, he was named to the All-NBA D-League First Team.

China and Philippines (2016–2017)
In July 2016, Stepheson joined the Grizzlies for the 2016 NBA Summer League. On November 15, 2016, Stepheson signed with Guangzhou Long-Lions of the Chinese Basketball Association. That day he made his debut for Guangzhou in a 99–89 loss to the Xinjiang Flying Tigers, recording 10 points, 14 rebounds, one assist, one steal and one block in 21 minutes off the bench.

In February 2017, he was signed by the Meralco Bolts as their import for the 2017 PBA Commissioner's Cup.

Yokohama B-Corsairs (2018–2019)
On December 7, 2018, Stepheson signed with Yokohama B-Corsairs of the Japanese basketball league B.League.  Stepheson averaged 15.2 ppg and led the Japanese basketball league B.League in rebounding with 13.6 rpg.

Blackwater Elite (2019)
Stepheson signed with the Blackwater Elite of the PBA. 

Stepheson averaged 22 ppg and 22 rpg for Blackwater Elite.

NBA Career statistics

Regular season 

|-
| style="text-align:left;"| 
| style="text-align:left;"| L.A. Clippers
| 4 || 0 || 3.0 || 1.000 || – || .000 || .5 || .0 || .0 || .5 || .5
|-
| style="text-align:left;"| 
| style="text-align:left;"| Memphis
| 4 || 0 || 15.3 || .308 || – || .400 || 6.5 || .5 || .3 || .8 || 5.0
|- class="sortbottom"
| style="text-align:center;" colspan="2"| Career
| 8 || 0 || 9.0 || .333 || .000 || .333 || 3.5 || .3 || .1 || .6 || 2.8

International Career Statistics

|-
| align=center | 2011–12
| align=left | Panionios B.C.
| EuroCup
| 21 || 23.4 || .623 || 1.000 || .535 || 7.3 || .8 || .4 || .9 || 10.3
|-
| align=center | 2013-14
| align=left | Union Olimpija
| Liga Aba
| 26 || 17.4 || .560 || .000 || .384 || 5.7 || .2 || .5 || 1.0 || 8.3
|-
| align=center| 2013-14
| align=left | Union Olimpija
| SKL
| 20 || 16.4 || .485 || .000 || .562 || 5.2 || .3 || .2 || .6 || 6.6
|-
| align=center| 2013-14
| align=left | Union Olimpija
| EuroCup
| 16 || 17.3 || .637 || .000 || .358 || 6.3 || .3 || .3 || .9 || 8.4
|-
| align=center| 2014-15
| align=left| Istanbul BB
| TBL
| 29 || 26.8 || .563 || .000 || .437 || 9.2 || .9 || .3 || .9 || 12.3
|-class=sortbottom
| align="center" colspan=2 | Career
|| ||  112 ||  20.8 || .571 || .200 || .462 || 6.9 || .5 || .3 || .9 || 9.4

The Basketball Tournament
Alex Stepheson played for Sons of Westwood in the 2018 edition of The Basketball Tournament. Sons of Westwood made it to the Super 16 before falling to Team Challenge ALS.

Acting career
Stepheson made his acting debut in the critically acclaimed TV Series, The Perfect Plan in 2018.

See also
2006 high school boys basketball All-Americans

References

External links

Alex Stepheson at eurocupbasketball.com
Alex Stepheson  at usctrojans.com
Stepheson Makes NBA Debut For Clippers

1987 births
Living people
American expatriate basketball people in China
American expatriate basketball people in Greece
American expatriate basketball people in the Philippines
American expatriate basketball people in Slovenia
American expatriate basketball people in Turkey
Basketball players from Los Angeles
Centers (basketball)
Harvard-Westlake School alumni
Iowa Energy players
İstanbul Büyükşehir Belediyespor basketball players
KK Olimpija players
Koshigaya Alphas players
Los Angeles Clippers players
Memphis Grizzlies players
Meralco Bolts players
North Carolina Tar Heels men's basketball players
Panionios B.C. players
Parade High School All-Americans (boys' basketball)
Philippine Basketball Association imports
Power forwards (basketball)
Sportspeople from Los Angeles County, California
Undrafted National Basketball Association players
USC Trojans men's basketball players
Yokohama B-Corsairs players
American expatriate basketball people in Japan
American men's basketball players
Blackwater Bossing players